Armaan Franklin (born November 17, 2000) is an American college basketball player for the Virginia Cavaliers of the Atlantic Coast Conference (ACC). He previously played for the Indiana Hoosiers.

High school career
Frankln was a three-year starter for the Cathedral Irish, who was coached by Jason Delaney, and led them to a 19–5 record as a junior. He averaged 10.0 points and 3.0 rebounds as a sophomore and 23.0 points, 7.8 rebounds, and 3.8 assists per game as a junior. Following his junior year, he was part of the core team of Indiana Junior All-Stars was part of the Supreme 15 All-State underclass team as chosen by the Indiana Basketball Coaches Association. Franklin averaged 23.8 points, 7.5 rebounds and 2.3 steals per game as a senior in 2018–19. He registered 23 points, 7.8 rebounds and 3.8 assists per game as a junior in 2017–18.

Recruiting
Franklin received offers from Indiana, Purdue, Louisville, Ohio State, Clemson, Butler and Xavier among others. He committed to IU on September 6, 2018 and signed his letter of intent on November 18, 2018.

College career

Indiana
On July 1, 2019, Franklin enrolled at Indiana University. As a freshman, he started in 9 of 32 games and averaged 3.7 ppg while averaging 13.8 mpg. He scored a season-high 17 points, including the game-winning 3-pointer with 15.7 seconds left against Notre Dame. As a sophomore, he averaged 11.4 ppg and 30.1 mpg while starting 20 out of 22 games. Franklin had one of the best games of his career with 13 points, 8 boards, 5 assists in 40 minutes against Stanford. He also held top-10 recruit Ziaire Williams to 1-of-10 shooting. Franklin shot a team-best 42.4 percent from three-point range for the Hoosiers during his sophomore season. He was Indiana's most consistent shooter of the season. He was also the second-leading scorer for Indiana and one of the Big Ten's most improved players. Highlights of the season included Franklin nailing a dramatic game-winner at the buzzer of a 67–65 upset win over AP No. 8 Iowa.

Virginia
On March 23, 2021, due to the firing of Indiana head coach Archie Miller, Franklin entered the transfer portal, tentatively ending his career as a Hoosier. But he nearly re-committed to Indiana after the hiring of Mike Woodson, ultimately choosing Virginia over Indiana after also considering Illinois, Louisville, and Georgia as transfer destinations. Franklin committed to Virginia sight unseen, without ever visiting the Charlottesville campus, due to the COVID-19 pandemic. Franklin, his mother, aunt, his two brothers and his trainer all wrote down what they felt the best destination would be for Franklin's final three years of collegiate eligibility after talking to each staff; all six had Virginia at the top of their lists.

Franklin is eligible for three years of play at Virginia because all Division I athletes who played in the 2020–21 season were granted an extra year of eligibility.

Career statistics

College

|-
| style="text-align:left;"| 2019–20
| style="text-align:left;"| Indiana
| 32 || 9 || 13.8 || .348 || .266 || .615 || 1.6 || 1.3 || .3 || .1 || 3.7
|-
| style="text-align:left;"| 2020–21
| style="text-align:left;"| Indiana
| 22 || 20 || 30.1 || .429 || .424 || .741 || 4.1 || 2.1 || 1.2 || .2 || 11.4
|-
| style="text-align:left;"| 2021–22
| style="text-align:left;"| Virginia
| 35 || 34 || 29.5 || .392 || .296 || .760 || 2.8 || 1.4 || 1.0 || .3 || 11.1
|-
| style="text-align:left;"| 2022–23
| style="text-align:left;"| Virginia
| 33 || 33 || 29.5 || .424 || .373 || .709 || 4.1 || 1.4 || .9 || .4 || 12.4
|- class="sortbottom"
| style="text-align:center;" colspan="2"| Career
| 122 || 96 || 25.5 || .405 || .340 || .717 || 3.1 || 1.5 || .8 || .2 || 9.6

References

External links
Virginia Cavaliers bio
Indiana Hoosiers bio

2000 births
Living people
American men's basketball players
Basketball players from Indiana
Indiana Hoosiers men's basketball players
Shooting guards
Virginia Cavaliers men's basketball players